Peppermint is a 2018 American vigilante action thriller film directed by Pierre Morel and starring Jennifer Garner. Also featuring John Ortiz, John Gallagher Jr., Juan Pablo Raba, and Tyson Ritter, the plot follows a mother who transforms herself into a vigilante in a quest for revenge against the drug cartel that killed her daughter and husband.

The film was released in the United States on September 7, 2018. It grossed $53 million worldwide and received generally negative reviews from critics, but more positive reviews from audiences. The film was released on Netflix in 2020, as well as other platforms.

Plot

An unidentified woman engages in a brutal fight with a man in a car. After a fierce struggle, she manages to shoot him in the head.

Five years earlier, the same woman, Riley North, is working as a banker in Los Angeles, struggling to make ends meet. Her husband, Chris, owns a failing mechanic shop, and together, they have a ten-year-old daughter, Carly. Chris's friend tries to coerce him into robbing Diego Garcia, a powerful drug lord. Chris turns him down; however, Garcia, having already discovered his involvement, orders his men to make an example of him. When Riley and Chris take Carly out to a carnival for her birthday, Diego's men gun down the family in a drive-by shooting, killing Carly and Chris and injuring Riley.

Despite her injuries, Riley is able to positively identify the shooters. The LAPD detectives handling the case are hesitant to pursue charges against the three, as they are members of Garcia's drug cartel, which wields considerable power and influence. Prior to the preliminary hearing, Riley is visited by the perpetrators's lawyer, who tries to bribe her. She refuses the bribe, but the lawyer notices she has anti-psychotic medication at home and uses this information to paint her as an unreliable witness. Judge Stevens, who is secretly on the cartel's payroll, declares there is insufficient evidence to allow the perpetrators to stand trial and dismisses the case, while the prosecuting lawyers do nothing. Outraged, Riley tries to attack her family's killers, but she is subdued and ordered to be held at a psychiatric ward. En route, she escapes and vanishes.

Five years later, Detectives Moises Beltran and Stan Carmichael arrive at the site of the carnival and find the three shooters hanging from the Ferris wheel, having been killed by Riley. The killings attract the attention of FBI agent Lisa Inman. Inman explains to the detectives that before vanishing, Riley robbed the bank she used to work at, and that she has now returned, having robbed a gun store to steal a wide arsenal of weapons and ammunition.

Riley kills Judge Stevens by blowing up his house, having already killed the defense and prosecution lawyers involved. The police decide to tell the media about Riley, which causes a debate on social media between those who see her as a hero and those who see her as a criminal.

Riley heads to a business that is a front for Diego's money laundering, where she kills most of his men. Diego realizes Riley is responsible for his recent shipments going missing and resolves to kill her. Inman discovers Riley has been living in Skid Row, owing to recent changes to crime patterns in the area. She finds Riley's van, full of the stolen weapons, and learns that the people there see Riley as their guardian angel for keeping them safe.

Riley survives a trap set by Diego, follows his henchmen to Diego's home, and kills his many guards. When Diego's young daughter, who evokes her own murdered child, interrupts her as she confronts Diego, she hesitates allowing Diego to wound her.  She flees as law enforcement arrives on the property. Inman calls Carmichael to Skid Row to wait for Riley, but Carmichael, secretly on Diego's payroll, shoots Inman dead and notifies Diego of Riley's likely destination.

Riley returns to Skid Row, which is swarming with Diego's men. She manages to kill several of them before finding Inman's body. Using Inman's phone, Riley contacts the media to reveal her location, alerting both the media and the police to the scene, and confronts Diego, stalling him long enough for the police to arrive. Believing Carmichael betrayed him, Diego shoots him and flees, only to be beaten down by Riley. Beltran and the LAPD surround Riley and Diego; Beltran assures Riley that Diego will be brought to justice this time, but Riley remains unconvinced, as the justice system failed her previously. With no chance to escape and underestimating Riley's resolve, Diego mocks Riley, confident that she can't kill him now and that she will spend more time in prison than him. However, Riley states that they will not be going to prison and shoots Diego in the head; the police fire at Riley, but she manages to escape.

Beltran finds Riley wounded at her family's gravestone and despite Riley's expressed desire to die, has her taken to a hospital. Beltran later visits her, telling her that there are those who agree with what she did, and slips her the key to her handcuffs, allowing Riley to escape again.

Cast

Production
In May 2017 director Pierre Morel was attached to the project, he previously directed the first film in the Taken series starring Liam Neeson. The script, influenced by the Marvel Comics character Frank Castle / Punisher, came from writer Chad St. John, who previously co-wrote the script for London Has Fallen. In August 2017, Jennifer Garner was in talks to join the film as Riley North, a woman who, driven by the deaths of her husband and daughter, killed by a cartel, wages a one-woman war on crime using various weapons. The title of the film, "Peppermint", refers both to the flavor of ice-cream the character's daughter was eating upon her death, and the eventual alias taken by her as she embarks on her crusade.

Filming took place on location in California over fifty days.

Stunt coordinator Don Lee previously worked with Garner on Daredevil and Elektra.
Garner trained for three months to prepare. Training included dance, cardio and weight training, boxing workouts, artillery sessions, and stunt work with her longtime double, Shauna Duggins.

Release
The film premiered at the Regal Cinemas L.A. Live Stadium 14 in Los Angeles on August 28, 2018. Ahead of the release of the film Garner received a star on the Hollywood Walk of Fame.

The film went on general release in the United States on September 7, 2018.

Box office
Peppermint has grossed $35.4 million in the United States and Canada, and $18.4 million in other territories, for a total worldwide gross of $53.8 million, against a production budget of $22.8 million, to $25 million.

In the United States and Canada, Peppermint was released alongside The Nun and God Bless the Broken Road, and was projected to gross $10–13million from 2,980 theaters in its opening weekend. The film made $4.7million on its first day, including $800,000 from Thursday night previews. It went on to debut to $13.4million, finishing second at the box office, behind The Nun.

Critical response
The website's critical consensus reads, "Far from refreshing, Peppermint wastes strong work from Jennifer Garner on a dreary vigilante-revenge story that lacks unique twists or visceral thrills." On Metacritic, the film has a weighted average score of 29 out of 100, based on 26 critics, indicating "generally unfavorable reviews". Audiences polled by CinemaScore gave the film an average grade of "B+" on an A+ to F scale.

Frank Scheck of The Hollywood Reporter called the film "Death Wish on steroids", and said it "lacks subtlety and anything even remotely resembling credibility, but, like its heroine, it certainly gets the job done". IndieWire's Jude Dry gave the film a "C+". He wrote that Garner deserves to be in better films, and said the film is a "rare return to form for Garner, who doles out her vigilante justice with effortless charm. Unfortunately, that's about the only reason to see Peppermint".

Richard Roeper of the Chicago Sun-Times gave the film two out of four stars, writing, "In the stylishly directed but gratuitously nasty and cliché-riddled Peppermint, Garner plays essentially two characters cut from the same person."  Writing for TheWrap, Todd Gilchrist said that Peppermint "ultimately possesses the stale predictability of an unwrapped candy discovered at the bottom of a purse."
Andrew Barker of Variety wrote: "Garner gives everything that is asked of her, from brute physicality to dewy-eyed tenderness, but this half-witted calamity botches just about everything else. Drably by-the-numbers except for the moments where it goes gobsmackingly off-the-rails, Peppermint misfires from start to finish."
Emily Yoshida of New York Magazine wrote: "There was a time when a woman being the star of her own bad action franchise could have been considered the apex of progress, but that time is past." Yoshida criticizes the lack of originality in the film and says that casting Garner is not enough to change that.

Accolades

References

External links
 
 

2018 films
2018 action thriller films
2010s vigilante films
American action thriller films
American films about revenge
American vigilante films
Fictional portrayals of the Los Angeles Police Department
Films about mass murder
Films about child death
Films about the Federal Bureau of Investigation
Films about organized crime in the United States
Films directed by Pierre Morel
Films scored by Simon Franglen
Films set in 2012
Films set in 2017
Films set in Los Angeles
Films shot in Los Angeles
Girls with guns films
Hood films
Lakeshore Entertainment films
MS-13
STX Entertainment films
2010s English-language films
2010s American films